Hina Khawaja Bayat is a Pakistani actress whose appearances include Uraan, Ishq Gumshuda, Aunn Zara, Humsafar, Zindagi Gulzar Hai, Muqaddas and Shehr-e-Zaat and Baaghi.

Early life
Hina is ethnically Kashmiri and lives in Karachi. She completed her schooling from a convent, after which she attended the St. Joseph's College in Karachi and completed her graduation in Liberal Arts. Hina went on pursuing product designing at Pakistan Design Institute before her acting career started.

Hina is married to Roger Dawood Bayat. He is a business personality of an International Conglomerate based in Dubai. The veteran actress credits her success to her husband Dawood and her mother who have been a big support throughout her acting career.

Career 
Bayat is also a human rights promoter and wants to make youth and women understand the ability to fight for their rights. She made her debut from the talk show “Andaaz Apna Apna” and “Baatein Mulakaatein”.

Talk shows like “Geo Hina Ke Saath” and “Uljhan Suljhan”, was her shot to fame, where she dealt with people's problems on a personal level on live calls. Hina Khawaja Bayat also co-hosted the show "Morning with Hum" along with "Atiqa Odho Atiqa Odho" , her Humsafar co-star. Most of her dramas are on GEO TV, and HUM TV.

Television

Web series

References

External links
 
 Hina Khawaja Bayat at nettv4u
 

Living people
Pakistani television actresses
21st-century Pakistani actresses
Pakistani people of Kashmiri descent
1961 births